Nyctemera pagenstecheri is a moth of the family Erebidae first described by Arnold Pagenstecher in 1898. It is found on Lombok, Sumbawa, Flores and Borneo (Pulo Laut).

References

Nyctemerina
Moths described in 1898